"Always Remember Us This Way" is a song from the 2018 film A Star Is Born and its soundtrack of the same name, performed by the film's star Lady Gaga. It was released as soundtrack's second single in Italy and France in January 2019. The song was written by Lady Gaga, Natalie Hemby, Hillary Lindsey, and Lori McKenna, and produced by Dave Cobb and Lady Gaga.

The song has received widespread critical acclaim and has reached the top of the record chart in Iceland and the top ten in Belgium (both Flanders and Wallonia), Hungary, Ireland, Norway, Portugal, Scotland, Sweden and Switzerland, the digital charts of Luxembourg, Slovakia and the combined European chart. The track has also reached the top twenty in Denmark, Estonia, France, Malaysia, and on the digital chart of Czech Republic. It reached the top twenty of the Australian and New Zealand charts, while achieving triple platinum certification from the former governing body.

"Always Remember Us This Way" received a nomination for Song of the Year at the 62nd Grammy Awards, the second nomination from the album in this category after "Shallow", which was nominated for the year before. Gaga performed the song live during her 2022 stadium tour, The Chromatica Ball.

Background and release

"Always Remember Us This Way" was written by Lady Gaga, Natalie Hemby, Hillary Lindsey, and Lori McKenna, and produced by Dave Cobb and Gaga. It also features background vocals from Hemby, Lindsey and McKenna. Bradley Cooper had approached Cobb for crafting the sound of the album, after listening to the latter's work. Cobb flew out to Los Angeles and met Gaga and Cooper for a writing session. He played the track "Maybe It's Time" (written by singer-songwriter Jason Isbell), which impressed Gaga and Cooper and set the tone for the soundtrack. They asked Hemby, Lindsey and McKenna to come down to Los Angeles and start composing tracks.

"Always Remember Us This Way" was released to Italian radios on January 4, 2019, followed by release in French radios two weeks later. A music video for the song was released previously, showing the sequence from the film when Gaga sings the track after being introduced by Jackson onstage, who sweetly tells her, "I love you, I'll always remember us this way". A vertical-shaped version of the clip was released to Spotify. Brooke Bajgrowicz from Billboard explained that the "reflective video" showed Ally and Jackson "falling in love with each other", while interspersed with scenes of the couple going on a motorbike ride, kissing in a parking lot and performing music together. The clip ends with the crowd chanting Ally's name, and Jackson walks over to embrace her.

Recording and composition

"Always Remember Us This Way" was recorded immediately after the songwriters finished composing it. They also provided backing vocals as Gaga recorded her vocals in the studio. Cobb said, "It was pure magic when that went down and you can hear it in the film—the energy and the excitement that was happening. It's amazing to hear that kind of voice come through headphones." Lindsey, who had previously collaborated with Gaga on her fifth studio album, Joanne (2016), recalled that the singer had imbibed in the character of Ally she was playing in the film completely. "She was living in the hurt and ache of Ally losing the love of her life. We all just wanted to hug her. She was so broken up and in so much raw pain," Lindsey added. McKenna described the songwriting as a powerful moment because the lyrics made them all tearful, and they decided that if "Maybe It's Time" was Cooper's character Jackson's song, then "Always Remember Us This Way" belonged with Ally.

According to Cobb it was magical when "[Gaga] got in the vocal booth on the microphone and the writers were in the control room. I was playing with the band, and it just happened. Her voice was as big as the house. All of us had goosebumps. That happens very seldomly." The song is a piano-driven country ballad, which is "pushed along" by Gaga's raw, powerful vocals. Following the first verse being on piano, the guitars and drums kick in from the second verse and Gaga's vocals build up to the final chorus uttering the lines, "When the sun goes down/ And the band won't play/ I'll always remember us this way". The song is composed in the time signature of common time and is performed in the key of A minor with a slow tempo of 65 beats per minute. It follows a chord progression of Am–F–C–G, and the vocals span from G3 to E5.

Critical reception
The song received widespread critical acclaim upon release. Jon Pareles of The New York Times described the song as a "hushed-to-heroic", Elton John-inspired "showstopper". Rolling Stone Brittany Spanos and The Washington Post Emily Yahr called the song "explosive" and "haunting", respectively. USA Today Patrick Ryan said the song "ranks up there with 2009's "Speechless" and 2013's "Dope" as one of Gaga's best ballads". Natalie Walker of Vulture thought that "this song really illuminates what a virtuosic vocal chameleon Gaga is", and compared aspects of the track to Lorde's "Liability" and the songs of Adele. Maureen Lee Lenker of Entertainment Weekly picked "Always Remember Us This Way" as the best track of the soundtrack. She opined that the song is "a poem in its own right, evocative and elegiac" with its lyrics, while also serving as a "showcase for Gaga's powerhouse voice, as it moves from the whisperings of its opening lines, soft and invoking love as an act of prayer, to the heroic belt of the chorus." 

Maeve McDermott of the Chicago Sun-Times wrote that "Always Remember Us This Way" was the soundtrack's "most intriguing entry". Carl Wilson of Slate praised Gaga's performance in the track, thinking that "this is the song she was searching for on Joanne ", and writing that "like a fearless vocal assassin, she annihilates anyone who remembers only the meat dress and puts herself about as close to Streisand’s plane (though not Garland's, sorry) as any current pop singer could." Jeremy Winogard of Slant Magazine thought that the song "allow[s] Gaga to flex her pipes." Writing for Pitchfork, Larry Fitzmaurice listed "Always Remember Us This Way" as one of the album's best, and called it "unabashedly sentimental". The Plain Dealer Joey Morona wrote, "Her considerable vocal prowess and control are ... on full display on the heartfelt slow jam". Adam White of The Independent felt that due to its "gorgeous melodies" it is a song which is "easy to return to over and over again".  The Daily Telegraph Neil McCormick picked "I'll Never Love Again" and "Always Remember Us This Way" Gaga's best solo tracks from the album, saying: "They may be clichéd, sentimental and old-fashioned, but they are powered by enough conviction and vocal drama to suggest that Lady Gaga has the star power to go supernova in any musical era."

Chart performance
Following the soundtrack's release, "Always Remember Us This Way" debuted at number-two on the US Digital Songs chart. The song consecutively debuted at number 41 on the Billboard Hot 100 along with four other tracks from the album charting. It was present on the chart for a total of nine weeks. As of February 2019, the track has sold 248,000 copies in the United States and accumulated 71 million streams. The track debuted at number 32 on the Canadian Hot 100 while entering their Digital Songs chart at number-two. In Australia, the song entered the ARIA Singles Chart at number 18, and by next week reached a peak of number 12. The Australian Recording Industry Association (ARIA) certified it triple platinum for selling over 210,000 units in the country. Similarly in New Zealand, the song entered the singles at number 39, and after a few weeks reached a peak of number 14. The Recorded Music NZ (RMNZ) certified it Platinum for selling over 30,000 units in the country.

"Always Remember Us This Way" entered the UK Singles Chart at number 39 with sales of 11,029 units on the chart dated October 12, 2018. By its third week on the chart, the track had moved up to reach a peak of number 25 while selling 16,815 units, being present within the top 100 for eleven weeks. As of July 2022, the song has sold 982,000 copies in the UK with 118 million streams and is certified platinum by the British Phonographic Industry (BPI).

In Ireland the song reached number three on the chart in its third week. That same week first single "Shallow" held the top-spot on the Irish Singles Chart while album track "I'll Never Love Again" also reached the top-ten. "Always Remember Us This Way" also reached the top-ten of the charts in Scotland, Sweden and Switzerland (number-one in the French-speaking part of Romandie), in the latter two in the same week.

Live performances

In 2022, Gaga performed "Always Remember Us This Way" at The Chromatica Ball stadium tour while playing on the piano, which was set inside a sculpture of thorns. The performance was called "beautiful" and "gorgeus" by Lauren O'Neill from i and The Guardians Michael Cragg, respectively. While reviewing the concert, Bob Gendron of the Chicago Tribune opined that the "balladic renditions of 'Always Remember Us This Way' and 'The Edge of Glory' exposed another facet of Gaga: that of a gospel singer in hiding".

During the tour's stop at East Rutherford, New Jersey, Gaga dedicated "Always Remember Us This Way" to friend/frequent collaborator Tony Bennett, and also interjected a reminder to be "kind to those dealing with mental health" toward the end of the song. In Houston's Minute Maid Park, she dedicated the song to her Houston-born friend Sonja Durham, who passed away years earlier due to cancer.

Credits and personnel
Credits adapted from the liner notes of A Star Is Born.

Management
 Published by Sony/ATV Songs LLC / Happygowrucke/Creative Pulse Music/These Are Pulse Songs (BMI). All rights administered by These Are Pulse Songs, BIRB Music (ASCAP).
 All Rights Administered by BMG Rights Management (US) LLC, Maps And Records Music/Creative Pulse Music (BMI).
 All rights administered by These Are Pulse Songs, Warner-Barham Music LLC (BMI) admin. by Songs of Universal (BMI) Warner-Olive Music LLC (ASCAP) admin. by Universal Music Corp. (ASCAP).
 Recorded at Coachella Valley Music and Arts Festival and EastWest Studios (Los Angeles, California)
 Mixed at Electric Lady Studios (New York City)
 Mastered at Sterling Sound Studios (New York City)

Personnel

 Lady Gaga – primary vocals, songwriter, producer, piano
 Natalie Hemby – songwriter
 Hillary Lindsey – songwriter
 Lori McKenna – songwriter
 Dave Cobb – producer
 Gena Johnson – recording
 Eddie Spear – recording
 Benjamin Rice – additional recording
 Tom Elmhirst – mixing
 Brandon Bost – mixing engineer
 Randy Merrill – audio mastering
 Chris Powell – drums
 Brian Allen – bass
 Maestro Lightford – keyboards
 LeRoy Powell – steel pedal guitar

Charts

Weekly charts

Year-end charts

Certifications and sales

Release history

See also
 List of top 10 download singles in 2018 (France)

References

2010s ballads
2018 singles
2018 songs
American country music songs
Country ballads
Interscope Records singles
Lady Gaga songs
Number-one singles in Iceland
Song recordings produced by Dave Cobb
Song recordings produced by Lady Gaga
Songs written by Hillary Lindsey
Songs written by Lady Gaga
Songs written by Lori McKenna
Songs written by Natalie Hemby
Songs written for films